Hamlet is a 1908 French silent film adaptation of the classic William Shakespeare play, Hamlet. The film was one of the earliest film adaptations of this play, and starred Jacques Grétillat and Colanna Romano. It was directed by Henri Desfontaines, and was one of twelve renditions of the play produced during the silent film era.

References

External links

Films based on Hamlet
1908 films
French silent short films
French black-and-white films
Films directed by Henri Desfontaines
1900s French films